Berco may refer to:

Berco S.p.A., an Italian manufacturing company
Berço SC, a Portuguese sports club
Victor Berco (born 1979), Moldovan footballer